Sarah Palin's Alaska is an American reality television show hosted by former Alaska Governor Sarah Palin. According to Palin, the show's aim is to bring "the wonder and majesty of Alaska to all Americans." The series, which began airing on TLC in November 2010, broadcast 8 episodes and 1 clip show. The show was part travelogue and part documentary series, according to a story in The Vancouver Sun. The show was cancelled after one season.

The show was produced by Mark Burnett Productions for Discovery Communications.

Reviews and reception
In reviewing the first episode, The New York Times said Sarah Palin's Alaska is  a reality show living up to its title, and "a nature series for political voyeurs" that allows "viewers to get to observe Ms. Palin observing nature".  The paper commended Palin for her political courage in appearing in the series and for not being afraid to be herself.

Five million viewers tuned in for the premiere episode, a record for TLC. Before the airing of the last episode, Entertainment Weekly reported that the show had maintained an average viewership of 3.2 million per week, but that it would not be renewed for a second season.

Episodes

References

External links
 
 
 
 "Gosselins Give 'Palin's Alaska' Ratings Bump", Multichannel News, December 13, 2010

2010 American television series debuts
2010s American reality television series
2011 American television series endings
American travel television series
English-language television shows
Sarah Palin
Television shows set in Alaska
TLC (TV network) original programming